Slave breeding was the practice in slave states of the United States of slave owners to systematically force the reproduction of slaves to increase their profits. It included coerced sexual relations between male slaves and women or girls, forced pregnancies of female slaves, and favoring women or young girls who could produce a relatively large number of children. The objective was to increase the number of slaves without incurring the cost of purchase, and to fill labor shortages caused by the abolition of the Atlantic slave trade.

Historical context

End of the American transatlantic slave trade 

The laws that ultimately abolished the Atlantic slave trade came about as a result of the efforts of British abolitionist Christian groups such as the Society of Friends, known as Quakers, and Evangelicals led by William Wilberforce, whose efforts through the Committee for the Abolition of the Slave Trade led to the passage of the 1807 Slave Trade Act by the British parliament in 1807. This led to increased calls for abolition in America, supported by members of the U.S. Congress from both the North and the South as well as President Thomas Jefferson.

At the same time that the importation of slaves from Africa was being restricted or eliminated, the United States was undergoing a rapid expansion of cotton, sugarcane, and rice production in the Deep South and the West. Invention of the cotton gin enabled the profitable cultivation of short-staple cotton, which could be produced more widely than other types; this led to the economic preeminence of cotton throughout the Deep South. Slaves were treated as a commodity by owners and traders alike, and were regarded as the crucial labor for the production of lucrative cash crops that fed the triangular trade.

The slaves were managed as chattel assets, similar to farm animals. Slave owners passed laws regulating slavery and the slave trade, designed to protect their financial investment. The enslaved workers had no more rights than a cow or a horse, or as famously put by the U.S. Supreme Court in the case of Dred Scott v. Sandford, "they had no rights which the white man was bound to respect". On large plantations, enslaved families were separated for different types of labor. Men tended to be assigned to large field gangs. Workers were assigned to the task for which they were best physically suited, in the judgment of the overseer.

Breeding in response to end of slave imports 
The prohibition on the importation of slaves into the United States after 1808 limited the supply of slaves in the United States. This came at a time when the invention of the cotton gin enabled the expansion of cultivation in the uplands of short-staple cotton, leading to clearing lands cultivating cotton through large areas of the Deep South, especially the Black Belt. The demand for labor in the area increased sharply and led to an expansion of the internal slave market. At the same time, the Upper South had an excess number of slaves because of a shift to mixed-crops agriculture, which was less labor-intensive than tobacco. To add to the supply of slaves, slaveholders looked at the fertility of slave women as part of their productivity, and intermittently forced the women to have large numbers of children. During this time period, the terms "breeders", "breeding slaves", "child bearing women", "breeding period", and "too old to breed" became familiar.

Slave owners often bred their slaves to produce more workers. The function of such breeding farms was to produce as many slaves as possible for the sale and distribution throughout the South, in order to meet its needs. Two of the largest breeding farms were located in Richmond, VA, and the Maryland Eastern-Shore.

Planters in the Upper South states started selling slaves to the Deep South, generally through slave traders such as Franklin and Armfield. Louisville, Kentucky, on the Ohio River was a major slave market and port for shipping slaves downriver by the Mississippi to the South. New Orleans had the largest slave market in the country and became the fourth largest city in the US by 1840 and the wealthiest, mostly because of its slave trade and associated businesses.

Slave accounts

In the antebellum years, numerous escaped slaves  wrote about their experiences in books called slave narratives. Many recounted that at least a portion of slave owners continuously interfered in the sexual lives of their slaves (usually the women). The slave narratives also testified that slave women were subjected to rape, arranged marriages, forced matings, sexual violation by masters, their sons or overseers, and other forms of abuse. 

The historian E. Franklin Frazier, in his book The Negro Family, stated that "there were masters who, without any regard for the preferences of their slaves, mated their human chattel as they did their stock." Ex-slave Maggie Stenhouse remarked, "Durin' slavery there were stockmen. They was weighed and tested. A man would rent the stockman and put him in a room with some young women he wanted to raise children from."

Dynamics

Personhood to thinghood
Several factors coalesced to make the breeding of slaves a common practice by the end of the 18th century, chief among them the enactment of laws and practices that transformed the view of slaves from "personhood" into "thinghood". In this way, slaves could be bought and sold as chattel without presenting a challenge to the religious beliefs and social mores of the society at large. All rights were to the owner of the slave, with the slave having no rights of self-determination either to his or her own person, spouse, or children.

Slaveholders began to think that slavery was grounded in the Bible. This view was inspired in part by an interpretation of the Genesis passage "And he said, Cursed be Canaan; a servant of servants shall he be unto his brethren." (Genesis 9); Ham, son of Noah and father of Canaan, was deemed the antediluvian progenitor of the African people. Some whites used the Bible to justify the economic use of slave labor. The subjugation of slaves was taken as a natural right of the white slave owners. The second class position of the slave was not limited to his relationship with the slave master but was to be in relation to all whites. Slaves were considered subject to white persons.

Demographics
In a study of 2,588 slaves in 1860 by the economist Richard Sutch, he found that on slave-holdings with at least one woman, the average ratio of women to men exceeded 2:1. The imbalance was greater in the "selling states", where the excess of women over men was 300 per thousand.

Natural increase vs systematic breeding
Ned Sublette, co-author of The American Slave Coast, states that the reproductive worth of "breeding women" was essential to the young country's expansion not just for labor but as merchandise and collateral stemming from a shortage of silver, gold, or sound paper tender. He concludes that slaves and their descendants were used as human savings accounts with newborns serving as interest that functioned as the basis of money and credit in a market premised on the continual expansion of slavery.

Robert Fogel and Stanley Engerman reject the idea that systematic slave breeding was a major economic concern in their 1974 book Time on the Cross. They argue that there is very meager evidence for the systematic breeding of slaves for sale in the market in the Upper South during the 19th century. They distinguish systematic breeding—the interference in normal sexual patterns by masters with an aim to increase fertility or encourage desirable characteristics—from pro-natalist policies, the generalized encouragement of large families through a combination of rewards, improved living and working conditions for fertile women and their children, and other policy changes by masters. They point out that the demographic evidence is subject to a number of interpretations. Fogel argues that when planters intervened in the private lives of slaves it actually had a negative impact on population growth.

See also

 Children of the plantation
 Enslaved women's resistance in the United States and Caribbean
 History of slavery in the United States
 Marriage of enslaved people (United States)
 Sexual relations and rape of slaves
 Treatment of slaves in the United States
 White slave propaganda

References

Further reading
Randall M. Miller, John David Smith (1988). Dictionary of Afro-American Slavery. Westport, CN: Greenwood Press. 
Frederic Bancroft (1931). Slave Trading in the Old South. Columbia, SC: University of South Carolina Press. 
JoAnn Wypijewski (May 2022). The Long Hand of Slave Breeding, Redux. In Counterpunch.

Slavery in the United States
Social history of the United States
Pre-emancipation African-American history
Eugenics in the United States
History of the Thirteen Colonies
Cultural history of the United States
African-American demographics
Sexual exploitation